The Croatian National Bank ( or HNB) is the central bank of Croatia. Until 1 January 2023 when Croatia adopted the euro, the HNB was responsible for the former national currency, the kuna. 

HNB was established by the Constitution of Croatia which was passed by the Parliament of Croatia on 21 December 1990. Its main responsibilities are maintaining the stability of the national currency, the kuna, and ensuring general financial liquidity within the country. HNB also issues banknotes and holds the national monetary reserves. In performing its duties HNB acts as an independent institution responsible to the Parliament. The bank has a share capital of 335,000,000 euros (c. US$450 million). HNB acts in accordance with Law on Croatian National Bank.

Foundation

On 21 December 1990 the Constitution of Croatia, determined in article 53, named the Croatian National Bank as Croatia's central bank, and declared its responsibilities: "Croatian National Bank is central bank of Republic of Croatia. Croatian National Bank is responsible, within its rights and duties, for stability of the currency and for liquidity of payments in state and abroad. Croatian National Bank is independent in its activity and responsible to Croatian Sabor. Profits made by Croatian National Bank belong to Croatian state budget. Position of Croatian National Bank is made by law." By amendments of Constitution of Croatia in 1997, Bank's earlier name National Bank of Croatia was changed to Croatian National Bank.

Functions of the Bank

The Croatian National Bank is the central bank of the Republic of Croatia and part of the European System of Central Banks. The primary objective of the CNB is maintaining price stability and the stability of the financial system as a whole. The Croatian National Bank executes monetary policy, manages international reserves of the Republic of Croatia, issues the Croatian currency - the kuna, issues authorisations of credit institutions, credit unions, payment institutions and electronic money institutions and supervises their operation. The CNB also issues authorisations of authorised exchange offices.

The Croatian National Bank is autonomous and independent in achieving its objective and carrying out its tasks. The CNB reports on its work to the Croatian Parliament.

Independence of the CNB

The independence of the central bank is a key precondition for a successful and credible implementation of monetary policy and for the achievement of the main objective of the central bank - maintenance of price stability.

The independence of the Croatian National Bank is in accordance with Article 130 of the Treaty on European Union, which guarantees the independence of national central banks of the European Union. There are several aspects of central bank independence: functional, institutional, personal and financial. Functional independence implies a clearly defined objective and autonomy in the choice of measures and instruments for its realisation. Institutional independence means that central bank decisions are independent from the influence of other institutions. Personal independence guarantees the protection of CNB officials from external pressures, excludes conflicts of interest and precisely defines the conditions for the appointment and removal from office of the Governor and other members of the CNB Council. Financial independence implies the possibility for the CNB to autonomously obtain funds for the purpose of executing its mandate, with the income and expense determined by the monetary policy stance.

Monetary stability
Stable prices is the main criteria for monetary stability. Stable prices are maintained by making sure price increases meet the Government's inflation target.

Financial stability
Maintaining financial stability involves protecting against threats to the whole financial system. Threats are detected by the Bank's surveillance and market intelligence functions. The threats are then dealt with through financial and other operations. 
The Bank works together with other institutions to secure both monetary and financial stability.

Governors
 Ante Čičin-Šain (August 1990 – May 1992) 
 Pero Jurković (June 1992 – February 1996) 
 Marko Škreb (March 1996 – July 2000) 
 Željko Rohatinski (July 2000 – July 2012)
 Boris Vujčić (8 July 2012 – present)

See also
 Economy of Croatia
 Euro
 Croatian kuna

References

External links
 

Banks of Croatia
Croatia
Donji grad, Zagreb
Hrvatska
National Bank
National Bank
Banks established in 1990
Buildings and structures in Zagreb
Neoclassical architecture in Croatia
Croatian companies established in 1990